Štjak is a village in the Municipality of Sežana in the Littoral region of Slovenia.

Name
The settlement was first mentioned in written sources circa 1400 as bey sand Jacob. The Slovene name Štjak is a contraction of š(en)t Jak(ob) 'Saint James', to whom the local church is dedicated.

Church

The parish church in the settlement is dedicated to Saint James and belongs to the Diocese of Koper.

References

External links

Štjak on Geopedia

Populated places in the Municipality of Sežana